Hustle was a British television drama series made by Kudos Film & Television for BBC One in the United Kingdom.

Series overview

Episodes

Series 1 (2004)

Series 2 (2005)

Series 3 (2006)

Series 4 (2007)

Series 5 (2009)

Series 6 (2010)

Series 7 (2011)

Series 8 (2012)

References

 

Hustle episodes